The Ethiopian Golden Age of Music was an era of Ethiopian music that began around the 1960s to 1970s, until the Derg regime progressively diminished its presence through politically motivated persecutions and retributions against musicians and companies, which left many to self-imposed exile to North America and Europe. Several artists and musical companies, as well as recording groups, emerged to produce their own singles and albums; the first being Amha Records, and Philips Records, Ethiopia Records and Kaifa Records, which is primarily based in Addis Ababa.

The musical era involved a blend of traditional and folk genre as well as soul and funk. Central innovation was the "Ethio-jazz" music and musicians Alemayehu Eshete, Tilahun Gessesse, Mahmoud Ahmed, Mulatu Astatke and others were prominent in this era. 

After the downfall of the Derg, the music industry revitalized; in 1998, Éthiopiques reestablished with collaboration to Mahmoud Ahmed, Tilahun Gessesse and Mulatu Astatke.

Background
In 1948, the government declared edict that authorized music recording headed by Hager Fikir Theatre. This caused widespread outrage as a result of restriction over freedom of music and any singers who tries to record their own music would be persecuted under asylum. Still, Ethiopian musicians used to listen tracks from outside, especially in the United States, from jazz, blues and funk among others. In addition, the Emperor Haile Selassie also considered the messiah of Rastafari, which reggae music became flourished thenceforth.

Description

According to commentators, the Ethiopian musical golden age spanned from 1960s to 1970s. During this age, Ethiopian music companies emerged to produce and distribute albums by various singers of the time. Record labels was familiar to young Addis Ababa residents as landmark of the city.

Record labels and music shops were able to produce their own music format by collaborating, typically implemented traditional elements. Girum Merasha, a resident of Piazza in the center of Addis Ababa described fans reaction "I think the closing of music shops takes away something great from Addis Ababa, not just Piassa."  The main problem in this period was the closure of music recording companies that weakened the album production and distribution. In the past three decades, 25 albums used to be released, the number now less than 10 annually. Sabisa Film Production manager Sewmehon Yismaw told EBR, "Instead, artists are choosing to reach more people with less expense way by singles. It’s easier to make a career like that because it is expensive and difficult to produce an album in the absence of music companies. Even if the artists managed to produce his own album, due to copyright related problems, he could not refund his investment." Sewmehon added the problem of music industry when distribution consisted of analogue formats like cassette tapes, copyright issues was highly prevalent. Even the introduction of CDs more simplified the copyright infringement.

This musical era was characterized by blend of soul (tizita) and folk elements in order to create "Ethio-jazz" genre as well as funk. Ethiopiques used such styles which borne numerous prominent artists of the time including Tilahun Gessesse, Alemayehu Eshete, Mulatu Astatke and among others. Foreign based Afrofunk bands like Boston's Debo Band and New York's Anbessa Orchestra had been popular in Addis Ababa in the 1970s. New York became centre of Ethiopian musical icons, including Hailu Mergia from Brooklyn and Mahmoud Ahmed who made appearance at Carnegie Hall and Girma Beyene who took CUNY's Graduate Center. Many musicians associated their release to North America such as major bands like Ras Band, All Star Band, Zula Band, Venus Band, Wabe Shebele Band, Roha Band and Dahlak Band, and Samuel Yirga which released his debut album Guzo. 

In the late 1960s, musician Amha Eshete founded Amha Records, an independent music label that released 103 singles in 6 years. Amha Records popularity eventually led to removal of government's edict. Its success also inspired the creation of Philips Records, Ethiopia Records and Kaifa Records, which were based in Addis Ababa. 

Since the seizure of the Derg in 1974, music often convoluted with politically inflated sentiments with many singers left the country to pursue career in North America and Europe until was the EPRDF took power in 1991. Amha Records shut down immediately with nightlife curfew was ordered while Kaifa Records existed as slightly underwent its production during this era. Francis Falceto, the curator of Buda Musique complained that the current music scene in Ethiopia "lost generation" with much production was diminishing time by time. In 1998, Ethiopiques reestablished its existence bringing long term collaboration with musicians like Mahmoud Ahmed, Mulatu Astatke and Tilahun Gessesse to musical scene.

List of prominent figures

Musicians
 Mahmoud Ahmed
 Tilahun Gessesse
 Alemayehu Eshete
 Bizunesh Bekele
 Hirut Bekele
 Mulatu Astatke
 Girma Beyene
 Getatchew Mekurya
 Teshome Mitiku
 Theodros Mitiku
 Menelik Wossenachew
 Getachew Hailu
 Samuel Yirga
 Neway Debebe
 Muluken Melesse

Bands
 Walias Band
 Roha Band
 Debo Band
 Dahlak Band
 Buda Musique

Record labels
 Philips Records
 Kaifa Records
 Ethiopia Records

Compilations
 Éthiopiques

References

Ethiopian music